Ubuntu Professional Certification which was first introduced in May 2006, was a computer based examination about the Ubuntu operating system.

The test was administered by the LPI (Linux Professional Institute) and the certification was part of the LPIC (Linux Professional Institute Certification) as an added module/exam to LPI 117-101 and LPI 117-102 certs. The LPI UCP exam code was LPI 117-199. The testee needed to pass all three exams (117-101,117-102 and 117-199) in order to receive a UCP certification. The 101 and 102 exams could be taken before or after the UCP exam(199).

This certification has been discontinued as of October 2010.

See also
Linux Professional Institute Certification

References

External links
Official Ubuntu Certified Professional Information 
Ubuntu Certified Professional Course Objectives 
Official Ubuntu Desktop Training Information
Google Ads Search Certification Answers

Information technology qualifications
Ubuntu